Yup (formerly known as MathCrunch) is a San Franciscobased educational technology company that provides on-demand tutoring services for math. The service is provided via a mobile app, which connects tutors with students in real-time. The company was founded in 2014, in San Francisco, by Naguib S. Sawiris, who also acts as the CEO. The company has been featured in publications such as Forbes, Fox, VentureBeat, and TechCrunch.

History

Yup (formerly known as MathCrunch) was founded in 2014 in San Francisco by entrepreneur and angel investor Naguib S. Sawiris. The initial idea for the creation of Yup came as Sawiris observed that students were texting friends and family to help them solve homework problems they could not; Sawiris saw an opportunity for both a business and to have a positive social impact in the development of such a service. In May 2015 Yup received $3.5 million in seed funding from venture capital firms Floodgate Fund, Formation 8, Index Ventures, Sherpa Ventures, and Slow Ventures, with the funding intended for expanding the company's reach in students. A few months later, the company announced further funding from Stanford University's StartX Fund, a fund established to provide assistance to Stanford University alumni. That funding was expected to help the company develop its platform's features, and recruit more tutors. In April 2016, MathCrunch rebranded as Yup, offering homework help in chemistry, physics, and math. Yup also announced that they raised another $4 million that will be used to fuel growth.

Services
Yup has developed a mobile app that connects students with live professional tutors, to help them solve homework problems on-demand. The app operates in a chat-like environment  the students snap a picture of the problem with their mobile devices or write out their questions and select the subject category. Yup matches the problem with available tutors and the selected tutor proceeds to guide the student to solve the problem leveraging chat and pictures to communicate.

Current topics covered
Yup tutors are familiar with, and can thoroughly explain, every math concept covered by the Common Core from early math all the way up to AP Calculus Level AB including questions in:

Pre-Algebra
 Basic operations (counting, place values, addition, subtraction, multiplication, division); Negative numbers and absolute value (no variables); Factors, divisibility rules, GCF/LCM (no variables); Decimals, fractions, ratios, and proportions (e.g. units, percentages); Exponents and roots (no variables); Order of operations; Grouping (associative, commutative, distributive) and equality (symmetric, reflexive, transitive) properties; Number types (e.g. rational, irrational, complex); Scientific notation; Other pre-algebra (e.g. prime factorization)

Algebra
 Coordinate plane basics (e.g. quadrants, plotting points, distance/midpoint formula); Variables, linear expressions, and solving linear equations; Graphs of lines (e.g. slope, intercepts, y=mx+b); Function properties (e.g. definition of a function, one-to-one/onto, even/odd, domain/range, inverses, composites, direct/inverse variation, piecewise, continuity/interval notation); Inequalities (with variables); Absolute value (with variables); Systems of linear equations; Simplifying monomial and binomial expressions (e.g. factoring/distributing a single term, exponent addition/subtraction); Logarithms, radicals, and exponential functions (with variables); Quadratic expressions, equations, and graphs, Higher polynomial expressions, equations, and graphs; Rational expressions, equations, and graphs; Circle, ellipse, and hyperbola equations and graphs; Function graph transformations (e.g. translating, reflecting, scaling); Complex (a+bi) coordinate systems; Sequences and series; Vectors and matrix basics; Other algebra

Geometry
 Names and properties of figures (e.g. perimeter, area, convex vs. concave); Similarity, scaling, and shape transformations; Congruence; Logic and proofs; Lines and angles; Triangles; Quadrilaterals; Regular Polygons; Circles; 3D solids and polyhedra; Other geometry

Pre-Calculus & Trigonometry
 Basic trigonometric functions and ratios; Trigonometric function graphs; Trigonometric equations and identities; Inverse trigonometric functions; Laws of sines/cosines; Other trigonometry

Basic Stats and Probabilities 
 Measures of center and spread; Interpreting/creating plots, graphs, and tables; Permutations, combinations, probability, and expectation; Probability distributions; Linear regression and correlation; Hypothesis testing and confidence intervals; Sampling and surveying; Other statistics

Calculus
 Limits and continuity; Derivatives; Extrema and critical points; Approximating area under curves (e.g. trapezoids, Simpson's rule); Antiderivatives and integrals; Solids and surfaces of integration (e.g. disks, washers); Fundamental theorem of calculus I and II; Mean value theorem, average change, and secants; Basic differential equation behavior (slope fields); Euler's method; Other calculus.

Previous topics supported
Yup previously offered support in Physics up to the AP Physics level 1 and 2 and Chemistry up to AP Chemistry.

However, as of summer 2018, Yup has removed its science coverage to focus on exclusively tutoring math topics. Additionally, Yup offers a blog with industry specific news for families.

Tutor and app details
The tutors working with Yup range from college students, to high school teachers, to college professors and are scheduled to provide  24/7 coverage. Downloading the app is free of charge. There are several subscription options depending on price point and subscription length. The iOS app has twice reached the second position for most downloaded educational app in the United States. Yup was also featured on the Apple Store from April 7- April 21, 2016.  Yup's tutoring services are provided to elementary school students to college students. Up to May, 2016 there were over 400,000 registered students, and more than 200,000 tutoring sessions completed via the Yup platform.

References

External links
Yup website
Yup Homework Help

American companies established in 2014
Companies based in San Francisco
Mobile applications
Educational software companies